George Henry Weideman (2 July 1947 – 27 August 2008) was a South African poet and writer.  Born in Cradock, Eastern Cape, he grew up between the Karoo of the Eastern Cape and the Northern Cape.  He matriculated from Namakwaland High School in Springbok.

At the age of nine, he was already interested in learning languages like Magyar (spoken in Hungary) and Icelandic, and by the age of thirteen he was already running the school newspaper.

In June 1966, as a second-year Bachelor of Arts student at the University of Pretoria, he published his first collection of poetry entitled "Hondegaloppie" (lit. "dog gallop"), which contained verses about the Karoo, Boesmanland and Namaqualand.  "As die son kliplangs spring", published three years later, also contains material that is mostly about the landscape and nostalgia.

In 1970, while he was teaching in Fraserburg, he published "Klein manifes van ’n reisiger" ("Little manifest of a traveller"), and in 1977, while teaching in Port Elizabeth, he published "Hoera, hoera die ysman" ("Hooray, hooray the iceman").  Poetry about love was included in these two:  he married Celién Nel from Fraserburg in 1973 while he was staying in Kenhardt.  They have two daughters, Melita and Siobhan.

While staying in South-West Africa from 1978 until 1989, George completed his doctorate and published his first collection of short stories, "Tuin van klip en vuur" ("Garden of stone and fire"), as well as releasing another poetry collection, "Uit hierdie grys verblyf" ("From this grey existence").  Three of his dramas was performed by the University of Namibia.

His first book aimed at the youth, "Los my uit, paloekas!", received the silver Sanlam Prize in 1992, and "Die optog van die aftjoppers" received gold in 1994.  The latter also received the highly acclaimed Scheepers Prize in 1995, as well as a nomination by the Children's Book Forum as IBBY Honour Book for the International Board on Books for Young People.

In 1994 his second collection of short stories appeared, entitled "Die donker melk van daeraad".

In 1997 he published 'n Staning onder sterre, a collection of poetry; Nuwe stemme, an omnibus of the works of eleven debut poets, which George arranged; and his first adult novel, Die onderskepper ("The Interceptor"), about a mysterious woman from the city. The latter won the 1998 W.A. Hofmeyr prize and came second place in the De Kat novel competition.

In 1998 "Pella lê ’n kruistog vêr", a selection from his previous collections, was published, as well as a youth novel, "Dana se jaar duisend", which again won the Sanlam prize for Youth literature.

The novel "Draaijakkals" was published in October 1999.

His radio drama, "Lig", won the third place in the RSG competition for 2000/2001.

Until his retirement, George was a lecturer at the Peninsula Technikon, now part of the Cape Peninsula University of Technology.

On 17 July 2004 he received the first Sanlam prize for Afrikaans theatre.

After a long struggle against cancer, Weideman died on 27 August 2008.

References

1947 births
2008 deaths
People from Cradock, Eastern Cape
Afrikaans-language poets
South African poets
University of Pretoria alumni
20th-century poets